Erkki Ertama born Bertel Erik Ertama orig. Enbom (26 November 1927 in Alavus, Finland – 16 September 2010 in Helsinki, Finland) was a Finnish composer and conductor.

References

External links

1927 births
2010 deaths
People from Alavus
Finnish composers
Finnish male composers
Finnish music arrangers